The Tory movement in Upper Canada was formed from the elements of the Family Compact following the War of 1812. It was an early political party, merely a group of like minded conservative elite in the early days of Canada. The Tories would later form an alliance with the Parti bleu in Lower Canada after the Union of 1841 and finally merge as a single political party, Conservatives, after 1867.

List of political figures with ties to the Tories

 Henry Sherwood - Mayor of Toronto, MLA in the Parliament of Upper Canada and later Premier of Canada West
 William Henry Draper - MLA in the Parliament of Upper Canada and later Premier of Canada West
 Henry John Boulton - Solicitor General and Attorney General of Upper Canada
 Archibald Macdonald - MLA
 Archibald McLean - MLA, Speaker and jurist
 Sir John Robinson, 1st Baronet, of Toronto
 Levius Peters Sherwood
 George Strange Boulton
 William Allan
 Augustus Warren Baldwin
 George Monro
 John Alexander Macdonald

References

Political parties in Upper Canada
Catholic political parties
Conservatism in Canada